Yuriy Anatoliyovich Gavrilov (February 27, 1967 in Donetsk - 6 May 2021 in Luxembourg) was a Ukrainian handball player who competed for the Unified Team in the 1992 Summer Olympics.

He won the gold medal with the Unified Team. The Lieutenant of the Reserves Yuriy Havrylov represented the Ukrainian Armed Forces. He played all seven matches and scored 19 goals. He was elected Man of the Match in the final game against Sweden.

From 1992 - 1996 he played for two different Spanish handball clubs.

In 1996 he moved with his family to Luxembourg and played for the HB Dudelange from 1997 - 2000 / 2001, with whom he won in 1999 La Coupe du Luxembourg as player and as the women's head coach won in 1998 La coupe du Luxembourg.

After 2001 he competed for 4 more years for the HB Kaerjeng and HB Peiteng.

After his retirement from Handball he worked and lived in Luxembourg.

Upon his death, the former teams he competed for in the Former Soviet Union, Ukraine, Spain and Luxembourg as well as the Ukrainian Handball Association and the International Handball Federation paid their tributes to him.

References

External links
 

1967 births
2021 deaths
Ukrainian male handball players
Ukrainian people of Russian descent
Olympic handball players of the Unified Team
Soviet male handball players
Handball players at the 1992 Summer Olympics
Olympic gold medalists for the Unified Team
Olympic medalists in handball
Medalists at the 1992 Summer Olympics
Sportspeople from Donetsk